Ofentse Bakwadi is a Botswana karateka. He represented Botswana at the 2019 African Games and he won one of the bronze medals in the men's individual kata event. He also won one of the bronze medals in the men's team kata event.

In 2018, he competed in the men's individual kata event at the World Karate Championships held in Madrid, Spain.

In 2019, he also competed at the African Beach Games held in Sal, Cape Verde where he won the one of the bronze medals in the men's individual kata event. He also won the silver medal in the men's team kata event. At the 2019 African Karate Championships held in Gaborone, Botswana, he won one of the bronze medals in the men's individual kata event. In that same year, he also competed in the men's individual kata event at the 2019 World Beach Games held in Doha, Qatar without winning a medal.

References

External links 
 

Living people
Year of birth missing (living people)
Place of birth missing (living people)
Botswana karateka
African Games medalists in karate
African Games bronze medalists for Botswana
Competitors at the 2015 African Games
Competitors at the 2019 African Games